Perrin Historic District is a national historic district located at Lafayette, Tippecanoe County, Indiana.  The district encompasses 173 contributing buildings and 2 contributing structures in a predominantly residential section of Lafayette.  It developed between about 1869 and 1923 and includes representative examples of Italianate, Queen Anne, Colonial Revival, Stick Style / Eastlake movement, and Bungalow / American Craftsman style architecture. Notable contributing buildings include the James Perrin House (1869, c. 1890), John Heinmiller House (c. 1885), James H. Cable House (c. 1898), Adam Herzog House (1878), Coleman-Gude House (1875), Frank Bernhardt House (1873), August Fisher Cottage (c. 1910), John Beck House (1887), an William H. Sarles Bungalow (1923).

It was listed on the National Register of Historic Places in 1979.

See also
Centennial Neighborhood District
Downtown Lafayette Historic District
Ellsworth Historic District
Highland Park Neighborhood Historic District
Jefferson Historic District
Ninth Street Hill Neighborhood Historic District
Park Mary Historic District
St. Mary Historic District
Upper Main Street Historic District

References

Historic districts on the National Register of Historic Places in Indiana
Bungalow architecture in Indiana
Italianate architecture in Indiana
Queen Anne architecture in Indiana
Colonial Revival architecture in Indiana
Neighborhoods in Lafayette, Indiana
Historic districts in Lafayette, Indiana
National Register of Historic Places in Tippecanoe County, Indiana